Norwalk Hospital is a not-for-profit, acute care community teaching hospital in the Hospital Hill section of Norwalk, Connecticut. The hospital serves a population of 250,000 in lower Fairfield County, Connecticut. The 366-bed hospital has more than 500 physicians on its active medical staff, and 2,000 health professionals and support personnel. The hospital was part of the Western Connecticut Health Network, which included two other hospitals - Danbury Hospital and New Milford Hospital - up until April 2019, when WCHN merged with Health Quest to form Nuvance Health.

Quality and Safety
The hospital was awarded the HealthGrades Distinguished Hospital Award for Clinical Excellence in 2010, 2011 and 2012. HealthGrades, an independent health care ratings organization, analyzed three years of Medicare data and determined that Norwalk Hospital ranked in the top five percent of all hospitals nationally for clinical excellence. This top tier of hospitals was found by HealthGrades to have statistically significantly lower patient mortality and in-hospital complications than other hospitals.

Norwalk Hospital also offers specialty centers and surgical weight loss, sleep disorders, and wound care and hyperbaric medicine. Norwalk Hospital manages and operates the 911 ambulance service for Norwalk and provides paramedic services for the towns of Wilton, Weston, Westport and New Canaan.

Norwalk Hospital is a major landowner in the Spring Hill neighborhood. Aside from the land on which the hospital buildings are located, the hospital owns more than a dozen parcels totaling roughly six acres on Truman, Stevens and Maple Streets, Magnolia Avenue and Rhodonolia. The parcels contain houses, condominiums and medical facilities.

Education
Some of Norwalk Hospital's medical education programs are affiliated with the Yale School of Medicine.  The Department of Medicine-based Internal Medicine Residency is recognized as high quality with graduates going on to practice and pursue fellowships at leading health care institutions.   Many of the hospital's physicians engage in research designed to provide patients with new treatments. Norwalk Hospital provides a variety of clinical programs and health education classes to local groups and organizations.

The hospital has a fully accredited, three-year residency program in internal medicine and diagnostic radiology, one-year physician assistant residency programs in surgery and education opportunities in anesthesiology. The Department of Medicine sponsors subspecialty fellowship training programs in Gastroenterology, Nutrition, Pulmonary, Sleep and Critical Care Medicine (in conjunction with the Yale School of Medicine). The Section of Pulmonary Medicine also sponsors a School of Respiratory Care in conjunction with the Norwalk Community College.

Areas of specialization
Norwalk Hospital provides a wide range of clinical programs, anchored by six signature services:
Cancer
Cardiovascular
Digestive diseases
Emergency care with Level II trauma accreditation
Orthopedics and neurospine
Women's and children's

The hospital also offers these specialized services:
Inpatient and outpatient psychiatric services
Inpatient and outpatient addiction rehabilitation
Hospital-based emergency medical services, considered one of the best in the state
Inpatient and ambulatory surgery
Sleep disorder laboratory
Acute inpatient rehabilitation unit
Hyperbaric medicine center

Expansion plans

In April 2007, Norwalk Hospital announced that its principal location on Maple Street would be renovated and four new medical facilities would be created, three in Norwalk and one in the Georgetown, Connecticut community that covers parts of Redding, Ridgefield, Weston and Wilton, Connecticut.

In May 2008 the Health and Wellness Center of Norwalk Hospital opened in the i.park Norwalk office park spanning the Norwalk-Wilton border on Route 7. Three medical practices staff the  space, which offers medical and wellness services and the offices of primary care physicians, obstetricians/gynecologists and other specialists.

Also in Norwalk, at the corner of Maple Street and West Avenue, the hospital planned a  Musculoskeletal Institute to open in 2008. The hospital also opened another  location for medical and office space on West Avenue.

References

External links

Norwalk Hospital Web page
Connecticut Department of Public Health
Hospital Performance Comparisons a report released in February 2006 by the state Department of Health

Hospital buildings completed in 1899
Hospital buildings completed in 1918
Hospital buildings completed in 1961
Teaching hospitals in Connecticut
Buildings and structures in Norwalk, Connecticut
1899 establishments in Connecticut
Trauma centers